Katarzyna Anna "Kasia" Smutniak (born 13 August 1979) is a Polish-Italian actress and model.

Personal life 
Smutniak was born in Piła, Poland. Her father, Brigadier General Zenon Smutniak, is a military pilot and served in the Polish Air Force. At 16, she obtained a glider pilot's license. Her mother was a nurse.

She had a daughter, Sophie, in 2004 with Italian actor Pietro Taricone who died in an accident in 2010. She had a son, Leone, in 2014 with Italian film producer Domenico Procacci. The couple later married in September 2019.

In addition to Polish, Smutniak is fluent in Russian, English and Italian.

Filmography

References

External links
 
 

1979 births
Living people
Italian actresses
Italian female models
Polish actresses
Polish female models
Polish expatriates in Italy
Nastro d'Argento winners
Polish emigrants to Italy
21st-century Italian actresses